Singapore competed at the 1958 British Empire and Commonwealth Games in Cardiff, Wales, for its first time at the Commonwealth Games. It was represented by three athletes, competing in two sports. It won two gold medals from weightlifting.

Medalists

Weightlifting
Tan Howe Liang broke the world record by lifting 347 pounds in the Clean & Jerk portion in the 67.5kg Combined weight event.

Athletics
Men
Track events

References 

1966
Nations at the 1966 British Empire and Commonwealth Games
British Empire and Commonwealth Games